Cleidochasmatidae is a family of bryozoans belonging to the order Cheilostomatida.

Genera:
 Anchicleidochasma Soule, Soule & Chaney, 1991
 Calyptooecia Winston, 1984
 Characodoma Maplestone, 1900
 Cleidochasmidra Ünsal & d'Hondt, 1979
 Fedorella Silén, 1947
 Gemelliporina Bassler, 1936
 Yrbozoon Gordon, 1989

References

Cheilostomatida